Nikolas Ferreira de Oliveira (born Belo Horizonte, Brazil in 1996) is a Brazilian politician affiliated to Partido Liberal (PL). Currently serving as Federal Deputy for the National Congress of Brazil, he was elected for a 4 years term in 2022, being the most voted Federal Deputy in 2022 Brazilian general election, with almost 1,5 million votes, and the most voted in Minas Gerais state history for that office. He is often appointed as a far-right wing politician by the Brazilian press. Formerly, he was elected councilor for Belo Horizonte, in 2020, the second more voted candidate before Duda Salabert.

References 

1996 births
Living people
Minas Gerais politicians
People from Belo Horizonte
21st-century Brazilian politicians
Members of the Chamber of Deputies (Brazil) from Minas Gerais
Liberal Party (Brazil, 2006) politicians
Brazilian city councillors
Pontifical Catholic University of Minas Gerais alumni